The Pritzerbe Ferry is a vehicular cable ferry that crosses the Havel River between Pritzerbe and Kützkow (Districts of Havelsee), both located in Brandenburg, Germany.

References 

Ferry transport in Brandenburg
Cable ferries in Germany